The Race to Urga, later renamed A Pray by Blecht, is an unfinished musical adaptation of the Bertolt Brecht play The Exception and the Rule.

Collaboration on the production was initiated in 1968, with Jerome Robbins asking John Guare to write the adaptation. Leonard Bernstein was to compose the music, with Stephen Sondheim onboard to write the lyrics. The new musical was announced to open at Lincoln Center in January 1969, but Robbins left the production during cast auditions, and the project folded.  

No cast album was produced, though a demo was recorded in 1968. Jerome Robbins returned to the show, still incomplete, as director and choreographer of an April 1987 workshop production at Lincoln Center.

Synopsis

Capitalism exploits the working class during the early twentieth century.

Workshop song list
 Prologue Marches
 Intro / In Seven Days Flat
 You're In Hann
 The Secret
 The Suspicion Song
 Coolie's Dilemma (lyrics by Jerry Leiber)
 Doors to Urga
 Get Your Ass In There
 Coolie's Prayer
 Number One
 The Zorba's Dance

References

External links
 Sondheim's Lost Musical

1986 musicals
Musicals based on plays
Musicals by Leonard Bernstein